Henk Hofs (5 May 1951 – 11 October 2011) was a Dutch professional footballer. Hofs played for Vitesse Arnhem between 1970 and 1973, before retiring due to a knee injury.

He was the brother of Bennie Hofs and uncle of Nicky Hofs.

He died on 11 October 2011, at the age of 60.

References

1951 births
2011 deaths
Dutch footballers
SBV Vitesse players
Footballers from Arnhem
Association footballers not categorized by position